Russians in Finland or Russian Finns constitute a linguistic and ethnic minority in Finland. About 30,000 people have citizenship of the Russian Federation, and Russian is the mother language of about 70,000 people in Finland, which represents about 1.3% of the population.

Russian citizens who moved before the Second World War are called "Old Russians". The next immigration wave happened after the dissolution of the Soviet Union, as Ingrian Finns remigrated to Finland. At present, marriage and family ties are two other common reasons for Russians to immigrate to Finland.

History 

The first migratory wave of Russians began in the early 18th century, when Finland was part of the Swedish Empire. About 40,000 Russian soldiers, civilian workers, and about 600 businessmen moved to the Grand Duchy of Finland, which became part of the Russian Empire in 1809. When Finland became independent in 1917, many soldiers returned to Russia. Many businessmen stayed, including the Sinebrychoff family. During the Russian Revolution many aristocrats and officers fled to Finland as refugees. The biggest refugee wave was in 1922 when about 33,500 people came to Finland. Many of them had Nansen passports for many years. During the Kronstadt rebellion about 1,600 officers fled to Finland. Russian citizens who moved in these three waves are called "Old Russians", whose 3,000–5,000 descendants live in Finland today. During World War II, there were about 69,700 Soviet prisoners of war in Finland, and 200–300 children were born to them and Finnish women.

A second major wave of immigration occurred after the fall of the Soviet Union. Many Russian guest workers came to Finland, working low-paying jobs. In the 1990s, immigration to Finland grew, and a Russian-speaking population descended from Ingrian Finns immigrated to Finland. In the 2000s, many nouveaux riches Russians have bought estates in Eastern Finland.

Population 

According to the Russian embassy in Finland, there are about 50,000 Russian-speaking people in Finland. However, in 2008 study of Aleksanteri Institute, calculated 45,000 Russian-speaking people. According to Statistics Finland, there were 87,552 Russian-speaking people in 2021. However half of Russian-speaking immigrants are Ingrian Finns and other Finnic peoples. In 2012, there were 30,183 people with citizenship of the Russian Federation – dual citizens included. Furthermore, there are people who have received only Finnish citizenship, and Estonian Russians. Two common reasons for immigration were marriage, and descendant from Ingrian Finns.

Culture

Russian language newspaper Spektr was founded in 1998, and radio channel Radio Sputnik (Russkoje Radio Helsinki) broadcast in the Russian language until 2018.
Many small Russian Orthodox Churches have been founded in Finland.

Manifestations of intolerance
In a 2012 poll, 12% of Russians in Finland reported that they had experienced a racially motivated hate crime (as compared to an average of 5% of Russians in all EU countries). 27% of Russians in Finland were victims of crimes the last 12 months, for example theft, attacks, frightening threats or harassment (as compared to 17% of Russians in EU).

In 2007 the European Commission against Racism and Intolerance reported in its Third report on Finland :

Notable Russians in Finland

 Georgij Alafuzoff, admiral
 Kirill Babitzin, musician
 Sammy Babitzin, musician
 Alexander Barkov, Jr., hockey player
 Alexei Eremenko, footballer
 Roman Eremenko, footballer
 George de Godzinsky, composer
 Maria Guzenina, journalist, TV host and politician
 Viktor Klimenko, singer
 Leo Komarov, hockey player (born in Narva, Estonia)
 Natalia Nordman, an author and the wife of Ilya Repin
 Ilya Repin, realist painter, moved in Finland in 1899, a naturalized Finnish citizen in 1918
 the Sinebrychoff family
 Boris Rotenberg, football player
 Anna Vyrubova, former lady-in-waiting and confidante of the last Russian Empress Alexandra Fyodorovna.
 Inna Latiševa, writer

See also
 Anti-Russian sentiment#Finland
 Finland-Russia Relations

References

 
 
Ethnic groups in Finland
Finland
Russian diaspora in Finland